Scythris lahaivora is a moth of the family Scythrididae. It was described by Bengt Å. Bengtsson in 2014. It is found in Kenya.

The larvae feed on Acacia lahai.

References

lahaivora
Moths described in 2014